Giorgio Magnocavallo (born 1957) is an Italian retired professional football player.

Life 

Born at Chieuti, Magnocavallo grew up in the Province of Bergamo and joined in his teen years the youths team of Internazionale. He started his professional career with Lecco.

In the following years he moved to Atalanta B.C, with which, in 1985/1986, he played his only season in Serie A.

References

1957 births
Living people
Italian footballers
Serie A players
Serie B players
Como 1907 players
Empoli F.C. players
S.S. Lazio players
S.S.D. Varese Calcio players
Genoa C.F.C. players
U.S. Triestina Calcio 1918 players
Calcio Lecco 1912 players
Brescia Calcio players
Atalanta B.C. players
S.P.A.L. players
S.S. Formia Calcio players
Sportspeople from the Province of Foggia
Association football defenders
Footballers from Apulia